Dogfight 1951 (aka 1951: World War One) is an iOS game developed by Finnish indie studio Treehouse Ltd and released on July 28, 2010.

Critical reception
The game has a Metacritic score of 86% based on 5 critic reviews.

AppSpy said " 1951 - World War One is a classic war-era dog-fighting title with a rock'n roll attitude that can only get better with time. " TouchGen said "World War One (1951) is a great purchase for anyone who enjoys aircraft games, shooters and anything with XP and level up elements in it. With its great implementation of controls and stunning visuals, it's a must buy! " 148Apps said " If you are up to a brisk, "top down RPG-ish plane shooter" challenge, then 1951 – World War One may be the perfect game for you. It plays well and it is pretty... what more do you want from an iPhone game? " AppSmile wrote "With its stylish presentation, RPG elements, and engaging controls, 1951 creates an exciting combat experience. " SlideToPlay said "It may not alter the course of history, but this fun flying and shooting game is great for a few hours."

References

2010 video games
IOS games
IOS-only games
Flight simulation video games
Shooter video games
Video games developed in Finland
Video games set in the 20th century